Jack Warner may refer to:

Film and TV
Jack L. Warner (1892–1978), head of Warner Bros. studio
Jack M. Warner (1916–1995), American film producer
Jack Warner (actor) (1895–1981), British film and television actor

Sportspeople
Jack Warner (catcher) (1872–1943), American baseball catcher
Jack Warner (pitcher) (born 1940), American baseball relief pitcher
Jack Warner (third baseman) (1903–1986), American baseball third baseman
Jack Warner (football executive) (born 1943), Trinidadian former football administrator and current politician
Jack Warner (footballer, born 1911) (1911–1980), Welsh football player with Swansea Town, Manchester United and Oldham
Jack Warner (footballer, born 1898) (1898–1950), English football inside forward, played for Man. City, Watford and Thames
Jack Warner (footballer, born 1883) (1883–1948), English football full-back, played for Preston NE, Southampton and Portsmouth
Jack Warner (sport shooter), British Olympic shooter

Other(s)
Jack Warner, founder of the Westervelt Warner Museum of American Art

See also
Jackie Warner (disambiguation)
John Warner (disambiguation)
Warner (disambiguation)